Pavel Kouba (1 September 1938 –  13 September 1993) was a Czech footballer who played as a goalkeeper.

During his club career he played for Dukla Prague, where he won the Czechoslovak First League four times. He earned three caps for the Czechoslovakia national team, and was part of the second-placed team at the 1962 FIFA World Cup. He played for AS Angoulême from 1969 to 1972.

His son Petr Kouba was also a successful footballer.

External links

External links

  ČMFS entry

1938 births
1993 deaths
Czech footballers
Czechoslovak footballers
Association football goalkeepers
Czechoslovakia international footballers
1962 FIFA World Cup players
Dukla Prague footballers
AC Sparta Prague players
Angoulême Charente FC players
Ligue 1 players
Czechoslovak expatriate sportspeople in France
Czechoslovak expatriate footballers
Expatriate footballers in France
Sportspeople from Kladno